Alexander Turnbull  (30 July 1884 – 3 May 1917) was a Scottish footballer who played as a forward for both Manchester City and Manchester United in the early 20th century.

Football career
Born in Hurlford to James and Jessie Turnbull of 1 Gibson Street, Kilmarnock, Ayrshire, Turnbull started his football career with his hometown club, Hurlford Thistle. He later moved to Manchester City. In 1905, City was found guilty of malpractice relating to payments of its players, and the entire squad was suspended from playing football. When the ban was lifted on 31 December 1906, Turnbull moved to City's crosstown rivals Manchester United, along with Billy Meredith, Herbert Burgess and Jimmy Bannister. His first game for United came on the next day, 1 January 1907, against Aston Villa. Along with Meredith, he helped the club to their first championship in 1908 and the 1909 FA Cup, scoring the only goal in the final, against Bristol City. In 1908 alone, he would score 27 goals in 25 games. On 19 February 1910, Turnbull scored the first ever goal at Old Trafford, in a 4–3 loss against Liverpool. He would go on to score 100 goals for the club in 245 games. His final game for the Reds came against Sheffield United in 1915.

Military career
Turnbull enlisted in the 23rd Battalion of the Middlesex Regiment (2nd Football) during the First World War before being transferred to the 8th Battalion of the East Surrey Regiment. After being promoted to the rank of lance-sergeant, Turnbull was killed during the Battle of Arras on 3 May 1917 aged 32. Turnbull's body, if recovered, was never identified. He is commemorated on the Arras memorial.

Match fixing
Turnbull received a lifelong ban from football in 1915 along with several others players after being found guilty of match-fixing. He was posthumously re-instated in 1919.

Family
Turnbull was married and had four children. Two of Turnbull's sons, Alexander Jr. and Ronald, signed amateur forms with Manchester United in August 1932, but neither managed to follow in their father's footsteps and they were released before making an appearance for the club.

Honours

Club
Manchester City
FA Cup: 1903–04
Manchester United
First Division: 1907–08, 1910–11
FA Cup: 1908–09

See also
 1915 British football betting scandal

References

External links
Sandy Turnbull Profile Football and the First World War
Profile at StretfordEnd.co.uk

1884 births
1917 deaths
Footballers from East Ayrshire
Scottish footballers
Manchester City F.C. players
Manchester United F.C. players
Rochdale A.F.C. wartime guest players
Clapton Orient F.C. wartime guest players
East Surrey Regiment soldiers
British Army personnel of World War I
British military personnel killed in World War I
Association football inside forwards
English Football League players
Sportspeople involved in betting scandals
Middlesex Regiment soldiers
FA Cup Final players
Military personnel from East Ayrshire